Nyack may refer to:

Nyack, New York, a village
Nyack College, whose main campus is in the village 
Nyack Pippin, or Nyack, a form of pippin apple
USS Nyack, the name of two U.S. Navy vessels 
Nyack, Montana, a location in Flathead County, Montana